Nevada's 2nd congressional district is a congressional district that includes the northern third of the state. It includes most of Lyon County, all of Churchill, Douglas, Elko, Eureka, Humboldt, Lander, Pershing, Storey, and Washoe counties, as well as the state capital, Carson City. The largest city in the district is Reno, the state's third largest city. Although the district appears rural, its politics are dominated by Reno and Carson City. As of 2017, over 460,000 people reside in Washoe County alone, totaling about two-thirds of the district's population.

The district was initially created after the redistricting cycle after the 1980 Census, when Nevada was split into districts for the first time. From then until 2013, it occupied all of the state outside of Clark County. From 1993 to 2013, it also included the far northern portion of Clark County. Until 2013, it was the third-largest congressional district by land area that did not cover an entire state. Even though it lost much of its southern portion to the new 4th District after the 2010 census, it is still the fifth-largest district in the nation that does not cover an entire state.

The 2nd district has always leaned Republican. It has been represented by only four people since its creation, all Republicans. Democrats have only made four serious bids for the seat. In presidential elections, the district has historically voted Republican; George W. Bush won the district by 20 points in 2000 and 16 points in 2004. However, in the 2008 election John McCain earned only 88 votes more (out of 335,720 votes) than Barack Obama in the district.

Former state Senator Mark Amodei has held the seat since 2011 after he won the special election to replace Dean Heller, who was appointed to the United States Senate following the resignation of John Ensign.

2011 special election 
On April 21, 2011, U.S. Senator John Ensign (R-Nev.), plagued by scandal and facing an inquiry by the Senate Ethics Committee, announced his resignation effective May 3.  On April 27, Governor Brian Sandoval announced he would appoint Dean Heller, the 2nd district's third-term congressman, to fill out Ensign's term in the Senate.  Heller had already planned to run for the seat after Ensign announced a month earlier that he would not run for a third term.  To fill the vacancy created by Heller's resignation on May 9, Sandoval was required to call a special election to be held within six months of the occurrence of the vacancy.

A special election was held on September 13, 2011. Former Republican state senator Mark Amodei defeated Democratic State Treasurer Kate Marshall.

Voting
Election results from presidential and statewide races

Results Under Old Lines (2013-2023)

Results Under Old Lines (2003-2013)

Results Under Old Lines (1983-1993;1993-2003)

List of members representing the district

Election results

1982

1984

1986

1988

1990

1992

1994

1996

1998

2000

2002

2004

2006

2008

2010

2011 (special)

2012

2014

2016

2018

2020

2022

Historical district boundaries

See also

Nevada's congressional districts
List of United States congressional districts

Notes

References
 
 Congressional Biographical Directory of the United States 1774–present

02
Congressional district, 02
Lyon County, Nevada
Douglas County, Nevada
Elko County, Nevada
Eureka County, Nevada
Humboldt County, Nevada
Lander County, Nevada
Pershing County, Nevada
Storey County, Nevada
Washoe County, Nevada
Carson City, Nevada
Churchill County, Nevada
Constituencies established in 1983
1983 establishments in Nevada